Coquito meaning "Little Coconut" in Spanish is a traditional Christmas drink that originated in Puerto Rico. The coconut-based alcoholic beverage is similar to eggnog, and is sometimes referred to as Puerto Rican Eggnog (though incorrectly, as coquito does not call for eggs). The mixed drink is made with Puerto Rican rum, coconut milk, cream of coconut, sweetened condensed milk, vanilla, nutmeg, clove, and cinnamon.

History
Coquito was originally found in Puerto Rico. However, drinks similar to coquito are found throughout the Caribbean.  There are two different theories about the origin of the drink. Some believe the person who created coquito is unknown along with how the recipe began.

Others say that the drink was brought to the Caribbean by the Spanish during Puerto Rico's colonial period. The Spanish took their version of eggnog and combined it with the local rum, creating coquito. As they continued to travel and settle in other areas, the drink followed them, with different variations around the Caribbean. The variations are very similar to what they considered the original recipe: milk and sugar. Although this was seen as the original ingredient, Puerto Rico altered it by adding coconut.

The recipe has 4 main ingredients but is not limited to these: 
 Coconut milk
 Coconut cream 
 Puerto Rican rum
 Sweetened condensed milk. 

The Puerto Rican mixed drink resembles eggnog and is usually served after dinner in a shot glass. Some prepare the drink with eggs while others don't. The drink is known to be sweet and strong (with rum).

Many families have their own variations of the recipe that are passed down through generations. That being said the drink makes its main appearance during the Christmas season.

Coquito has become much more popular recently. Some supermarkets and grocery stores sell pre-made bottles of coquito. Along with being in stores, there are competitions like Coquito Masters, which is an annual competition at the Museo del Barrio in New York City.

Jimmy Fallon is reportedly a fan, and has mentioned the drink occasionally in episodes of The Tonight Show Starring Jimmy Fallon. David Begnaud, regularly associated to Puerto Rico by his coverage of Hurricane Maria and other events on the island, famously served the hosts and staff of CBS This Morning with several bottles of coquito on the show's 2021 New Year's Eve broadcast.

Variations

There are many variations of coquito based on location and family traditions. Although all these variations are unique in their own way, they all have one thing in common, and that generally is rum, although some prefer to make it with another alcohol such as the Spanish liquor 43.

Other flavorings can be added. Star anise, pistachio milk, oat milk, coffee, nutella, masala chai, cream cheese, banana, and strawberries are most popular. 

 made for Thanksgiving with pumpkin pie spice and pumpkin purée. 

 blends Puerto Rico's national drink with its national holiday drink. The basic coquito recipe is blended with pineapple juice, maraschino cherries, lime zest, heavy cream, and bitters. 

In Arecibo, coquito made with lemon zest, honey, vanilla, and ginger with no spices was once popular. The honey replaced sweetened condensed milk. 

Pitorro rum ranges from 80 to 100 proof. Pittorro is also used to make coquito. In this case, coquito made with pittorro is served in shot glasses sprinkled with cinnamon and nutmeg.

Preparation
Depending on the ingredient of choice, coquito can be prepared over the stovetop or in a blender. 
Gently cooking the ingredients thickens the drink, keeps it from separating, and gives it a longer shelf life. This method usually contains eggs. Rum, vanilla, and other extracts are added after it cools.
Adding all ingredients with ground spices to the blender makes a fast alternative with no eggs. This usually results in the drink separating after a few minutes and the fat from the coconut solidifying, causing a chunky coquito with lumps.
Coquito is poured into glass bottles with one or two cinnamon sticks.
After coquito is prepared and chilled for a few hours it is ready to be served but best made two weeks or more in advance for full flavor.

Events
El Museo del Barrio in New York City hosts an annual coquito tasting contest called Coquito Masters on Three Kings Day in January. The competition was first established in 2002 and continues each year.

Other
 is a drink made in Puerto Rico for the holidays. The drink is made from guava paste cooked with cream cheese, evaporated milk, condensed milk, cinnamon, clove, nutmeg, and vanilla; rum is added once cooled. Coconut milk, coconut cream, and egg yolks can also be added.

References

Christmas food
Cocktails with rum
Mixed drinks
Puerto Rican cuisine
Cocktails with milk
Cocktails with coconut
Three-ingredient cocktails
Creamy cocktails